Cristian Marian Balgiu (born 3 August 1994) is a Romanian professional footballer who plays as a midfielder for CSA Steaua București In his career, Balgiu also played for teams such as Concordia Chiajna, CS Afumați, Academica Clinceni, Turris Turnu Măgurele or Universitatea Cluj, among others.

Honours
CS Afumați
Liga III: 2015–16

Turris Turnu Măgurele
Liga III: 2018–19

References

External links
 
 

1994 births
Living people
Footballers from Bucharest
Romanian footballers
Association football midfielders
Liga I players
Liga II players
CS Concordia Chiajna players
CS Afumați players
ASA 2013 Târgu Mureș players
LPS HD Clinceni players
ASC Daco-Getica București players
AFC Turris-Oltul Turnu Măgurele players
FC Gloria Buzău players
FC Universitatea Cluj players
CSA Steaua București footballers